Fueled by Hate is the fourth studio album by American death metal band Jungle Rot, released through Olympic Recordings on June 15, 2004.

Track listing

Personnel
David Matrise: Vocals/Guitar
Jerry Sturino: Bass Guitar
Chris Djuricic: Guitar
Eric House: Drums
Chris "Wisco" Djuricic: Producer

References

2004 albums
Jungle Rot albums